Mihai Cristian Tentea (born 30 December 1998) is a Romanian bobsledder. He competed in the two-man event at the 2018 and 2022 Winter Olympics.

Career
He was the youngest athlete in competition in 2018.

References

External links
 

1998 births
Living people
Romanian male bobsledders
Olympic bobsledders of Romania
Bobsledders at the 2018 Winter Olympics
Bobsledders at the 2022 Winter Olympics
Place of birth missing (living people)
Bobsledders at the 2016 Winter Youth Olympics
21st-century Romanian people